Adiamante is a 1996 science fiction novel written by L. E. Modesitt, Jr. It is outside the span of his series work but maintains several of his main themes, including justification of pre-emptive force, nanotechnology, a nearly destroyed but rebuilt Earth, misuse of technology leading to man's downfall, internalized information networks, and shortening or slurring of the names of present-day cities, countries and ethnic groups, along with historical events. For example, a major past conflict in the story was the "SoshWar", a corrupted form of Socialist War.

Plot summary
After gaining amazing power over genetics and technology, three sects of humanity have developed and split after a civil war on earth forced them apart. Now, far into the future, the deported sect has returned to force their rule on the remaining citizens of earth.

The Sects

The demis
Perhaps a shortened form of demigod. Demis are the product of generations of genetic engineering with integrated and non-intrusive cybernetics. Demis tend to use a more subtle but no less forceful approach than their cyb cousins. Demis focus more on acceptance of ‘whole body reality’ and used the precursor technology to achieve a sort of gestalt-consciousness. It is implied that this technology led to great self-understanding and awareness. Demis occasionally have draff offspring. There are no cybs born to demis.

The cybs
A shortened form of cyborg. Cybs are the descendants of people who integrated their consciousness with computers and whose objective is to lead a life bound strictly by machine-like logic and precision. While they have achieved great technological prowess their understanding of their motives, which they arrogantly presume to be logical, is highly flawed. Millennia ago the cybs lost a war with the demis and were exiled from earth. Millennia later burning with humiliation at their exile the cybs return to exact revenge on the descendants of those who exiled them. Cybs insist that all their children become cybs. There are almost no draffs on cyb worlds. Cybs do not have demi children.

The draffs
Draffs are neither cyb or demi. Possibly the name is derived from American English meaning dregs, or the refuse left from brewing. https://www.collinsdictionary.com/dictionary/english/draff. An ordinary draff prefers to keep their thoughts inside their head rather than using the fibre-lines of the cybs or the webs of the demis. A draff (on earth) still has the genetic engineering that the demis have, they simply have not received the full technological package of implants required to become a demi. Roughly 30% of draffs have the potential to become demis if they were willing to accept the societal price. Draffs sometimes have demi offspring on earth, but never cyb children. Draffs on other worlds might have cyb children.

The Culture of Old Earth

All citizens of old earth adhere to an agreed upon societal morality. This morality is supported by two documents: The Paradigms of Power, and The Construct. The former is the most important; the latter is a series of supplemental rules followed by Old Earth alone. The Paradigms of Power is a document that is universally applicable.

The Paradigms of Power

Society is based on morality.

Morality rests on consensus and requires the use of power to remove those who will not accept that consensus.

The continued existence of a shared morality rests upon the forbearance of every single individual within a society from claiming the whole fruit of his or her labour.

A society's ability to achieve consensus is inversely proportional to the size and complexity of society, to the degree of technological advancement, and to the speed of internal communications.

Power cannot be maintained and effectively exercised, without a moral structure accepted and practiced by all, because power attracts the corruptible, and corruption destroys consensus.

Certain individuals are born incapable of forbearance; so are certain cultures.

Thus the continuation of society rests on: the willingness of each individual to accept the shared values of the society, the willingness and the ability of those in power to remove those who do not support the morality of the society; and the willingness of all to limit the size and complexity of the society to the scope of the consensus required.

The Construct
The society of earth also adheres to a document called 'the construct' which provides additional guidelines for their society.

Mutual individual respect, and self-respect must be maintained, since the greater the mutual respect between individuals and the respect for the role of each individual within the society, the greater the stability of the society.

Because society is founded on trust, trust cannot be withheld on unfounded suspicion.

Threats are a form of mistrust, so are unprovoked violence, use of physical force, and manipulation of another. Failure to be trustworthy requires removal from society.

Attempts to re-define principles into written rules of conduct reflect mistrust and are doomed to failure.

Direct statements of individual desires are not forms of mistrust, but no individual or group of individuals is bound or required to fulfil another's desire.

Society may agree upon mutually restrictive and/or coercive measures, but only so long as such measures have commensurate impact upon those who develop and impose such measures.

1996 American novels
American science fiction novels
Novels by L. E. Modesitt Jr.
Tor Books books